Lefthand Branch is a rural locality in the Lockyer Valley Region, Queensland, Australia.

Geography 
Lefthand Branch is named for the creek, Lefthand Branch creek that runs the length of the valley and the creek is named for the fact that it turns left after splitting from Tent Hill Creek. The narrow valley runs south east for approximately 11 kilometers. It is mainly cattle properties and some small vegetable crop farms, although there are a few olive crops and a small turf farm.

History 
Hillview Provisional School opened on 16 October 1899. On 1 January 1909 it became Hillview State School. In 1914 it was renamed Viewland State School. It closed in 1923, to reopen in 1924 as Left Hand Branch State School, which finally closed in 1967.

References 

Lockyer Valley Region
Localities in Queensland